Rush Lake Township may refer to:

 Rush Lake Township, Palo Alto County, Iowa
 Rush Lake Township, Otter Tail County, Minnesota
 Rush Lake Township, Pierce County, North Dakota, in Pierce County, North Dakota

Township name disambiguation pages